Juma Pondamali  is a Tanzanian footballer  who played for Tanzania in the 1980 African Cup of Nations.

External links

Year of birth missing (living people)
Living people
Tanzanian footballers
Tanzania international footballers
1980 African Cup of Nations players
Association football goalkeepers